Shirley Dinsdale Layburn (October 31, 1926 – May 9, 1999), better known by her maiden name of Shirley Dinsdale, was an American ventriloquist and television and radio personality of the 1940s and early 1950s.

She is best remembered for her dummy "Judy Splinters" and for the early 15-minute children's television show that bears that name. In 1949, she received the first Emmy award (first award in the first presentation) for Outstanding Television Personality when she was a student at UCLA. After her television career, she also achieved success in a second career as a cardiopulmonary therapist.

Early life
Dinsdale was born in San Francisco, California in 1926. After being badly burned in a household accident when she was 5 years old, she was given a ventriloquist's dummy by her father, who manufactured dummies for department stores, as part of her recovery. That dummy, which she named Judy Splinters, inspired her to make her break into radio. Lawrence Johnson, a ventriloquist, helped Dinsdale improve her natural talent for throwing her voice.

Dinsdale was an A student at Drew School in San Francisco. By the time she was 16, she had received a Distinguished Honor Citation from the United States government for her promotion of war bonds. During the war, she was student chairman for Southern California Schools at War.

Career

Radio
Dinsdale made her start in radio in 1941 with Judy in Wonderland on KGO in San Francisco. The program later moved to KPO in San Francisco.

In 1942, she and her family moved to Los Angeles and she was given a spot on Eddie Cantor's program. She was called "radio's most refreshing discovery in years." A successful season on Nelson Eddy's Electric Hour program on CBS in 1945 led to a tour lasting almost 11 months, during which she visited patients in military hospitals under the auspices of the United Service Organizations and participated in more than 500 USO shows during that span.

Television
During World War II, she was an active member of the Hollywood Victory Committee. After the war, she made her break into the budding television industry on KTLA (also in Los Angeles) doing show announcements, birthday greetings, and small spots. These spots, while not initially prominent, garnered her critical acclaim and her Emmy award. (The award was given jointly to both her and her puppet.)

After receiving the award, Dinsdale was given her own weekly children's show (entitled simply Judy Splinters), which ran from June 13, 1949 to June 30, 1950 on NBC. It originated at KNBH in Los Angeles and was shown in the Midwest and East via Kinescope. In the years following, she had shows in both Chicago and New York City.

Post-ventriloquism career
In 1953, she embarked on the second phase of her life: retiring from show business, getting married and having two children. She remained married till her death.

In 1958, she appeared as a guest challenger on the TV panel show "To Tell the Truth".

In 1970, Dinsdale enrolled at the State University of New York at Stony Brook to study respiratory and cardiopulmonary therapy. She graduated class of 1972. Dinsdale served as the head of the Respiratory Therapy Department at John T. Mather Memorial Hospital in Port Jefferson, New York from 1973 to her second retirement in 1986.

Family
On July 14, 1953, Dinsdale married Frank Layburn, a field engineer, in Springfield, Massachusetts.

Death
She died from cancer on May 9, 1999 at her home in Stony Brook, New York. Survivors included her husband, a son, a daughter, and two grandchildren.

References

External links

1926 births
1999 deaths
American child actresses
American radio actresses
American television actresses
Deaths from cancer in New York (state)
Emmy Award winners
Actresses from San Francisco
Ventriloquists
20th-century American actresses